Mohamed Faki Mwinyihaji is a Kenyan politician. He is the current senator of Mombasa County

References 

Living people
Members of the Senate of Kenya
Orange Democratic Movement politicians
Year of birth missing (living people)